The United Kingdom of Great Britain and Northern Ireland competed as Great Britain at the 1924 Winter Olympics in Chamonix, France. Based on medal count, this was Great Britain's best ever performance at a Winter Olympic Games until the 2014 games were held in Sochi in Russia. On February 3, Great Britain won two medals on one day. This was not to be bettered until the 2018 games when 3 medals were won on one day.

Medallists

Bobsleigh

Curling 

|}

Figure skating

Men

Women

Pairs

Ice hockey

Group B
The top two teams (highlighted) advanced to the medal round.

Medal round
Results from the group round (Canada-Sweden and United States-Great Britain) carried forward to the medal round.

Speed skating

Men

All-round 
Distances: 500m; 5000m; 1500m & 10,000m.

References

Olympic Winter Games 1924, full results by sports-reference.com

Nations at the 1924 Winter Olympics
1924
Olympics, Winter
Winter sports in the United Kingdom